Chhip Suto Char is a 2016 Indian romantic drama film, Music and Sound design by Sanjib Sarkar, written by Jay Bhattacharjee and directed by Susanta Saha. It was released on 27 May 2016.

Cast
 Jay Bhattacharjee 
  Mou Badiya
  Debolina Biswas  
  Gaurav Ghosal

Music 
The Film's Music, & Sound Design was done  by award-winning composer Sanjib Sarkar

Plot
CHHIP SUTO CHAR narrates a story of three friends. Suman, an unsuccessful film director, plans to exploit his childhood friend, Joy's money by putting some bait in the form of girls with the assistance of a production manager, Amit. Joy being alone and depressed in his life, accepts the proposal and hooks his business partner cum friend, Pratik for the project. Pratik loves girls’ company in a different manner. They make a plot to exploit the girls in the process of making the film. They take interview of a lot of girls, which they even shoot without their permission. Five girls namely Richa, Sush, Koyel, Lucky and Rimjhiim are selected against some indecent proposals. Every girl has her own story behind her. Richa is very much professional in her dealings. She does not mix up between film and personal relation. Everybody except Koyel are well acquainted about the film industry and its dark side, but they do not even know that they are being trapped in the jaws of a heinous crime that is hovering over their head. The boys Imran & Ratul involved in the film understands the intentions of the director and producers. Amit becomes helpless and is victimized. Everything goes according to the plan of Sumon. Pratik and Joy meet with a life-threatening challenge from one of the girls during the action of their play.

References

External links

2016 films
Films shot in West Bengal
Indian romantic drama films
Films set in Kolkata
Bengali-language Indian films
2010s Bengali-language films